Palestinian exodus may relate to one of the following events:

 1948 Palestinian exodus 
 1948 Palestinian exodus from Lydda and Ramle
 1967 Palestinian exodus
 1949–1956 Palestinian exodus
 Palestinian exodus from Kuwait (1990–91)